Khadidjatou Fall, generally called Khadi Fall (born 1948) is a Senegalese author and former government minister.

She came from an educated family who spoke the Wolof language. Thanks in part to their efforts she went to some of Senegal's finer schools which prepared her for study in Europe. She received her PhD from the University of Strasbourg and spent time in Germany in the 1990s. She is a full professor of German at the University of Dakar.

She has written three novels and in 2000 was a minister in the Senegalese government.

Bibliography
Mademba. Paris: L'Harmattan. (Collection Encres noires), 1989. (173p.) . (An award winner in Senegal) 
Senteurs d'hivernage [Scent of the Rains]. Paris: L'Harmattan, 1993. (186p.) .
Kiiray  [Mask] Poèmes en prose . Iowa-City: IWP, 1995
Education Culture Emergence Dakar: Presses universitaires de Dakar, 2008. (191p.) .

External links
Profile at UWA

1948 births
Living people
Senegalese women writers
Academic staff of Cheikh Anta Diop University
Senegalese novelists
International Writing Program alumni